British rock band The Cult has released 10 studio albums, two live albums, six compilation albums, seven video albums, five box sets, 20 EPs and 37 singles.

Albums

Studio albums

Live albums

Compilation albums

Box sets

Video albums

EPs

Singles

Notes

References

Cult, The
Discographies of British artists